"Peter Quince at the Clavier" is a poem from Wallace Stevens's first book of poetry, Harmonium.
The poem was first published in 1915 in the "little magazine" Others: A Magazine of the New Verse (New York), edited by Alfred Kreymborg.

It is a "musical" allusion to the apocryphal story of Susanna, a beautiful young wife, bathing, spied upon and desired by the elders. The Peter Quince of the title is the character of one of the "mechanicals" in Shakespeare's A Midsummer Night's Dream. Stevens' poem titles are not necessarily a reliable indicator of the meaning of his poems, but Milton Bates suggests that it serves as ironic stage direction, the image of "Shakespear's rude mechanical pressing the delicate keyboard with his thick fingers" expressing the poet's self-deprecation and betraying Stevens's discomfort with the role of "serious poet" in those early years.

The poem is very sensual—Mark Halliday calls it Stevens' "most convincing expression of sexual desire". (Honorable mention might go to "Cy Est Pourtraicte, Madame Ste Ursule, et Les Unze Mille Vierges".) But "Peter Quince" has dimensions beyond Susanna's ablutions and the elders' desire.

For instance, the poem's Part IV contains a stunning inversion of Platonism and related theories about universals, such as the universal (property, feature) beauty.  Instead of saying that beauty is an abstract unchanging Platonic Form existing perfectly in a world separate from the five senses, or an abstract unchanging concept in the mind, the poem says that, paradoxically, "Beauty is momentary in the mind": only transient beauty in the flesh is immortal. Kessler notes that "Unlike Plato or Kant, Stevens strives to unite idea and image."

Robert Buttel observes that each of the four sections has its "appropriate rhythms and tonalities", reading the poem as "part of the general movement to bring music and poetry closer together". He describes Stevens as "the musical imagist" and credits the musical architecture with organically unifying the poem. Some don't like it. For the New York Times poetry critic writing in 1931, it is a specimen of the "pure poetry" of the age that "cannot endure" because it is a "stunt" in the fantastic and the bizarre.

"Turning of music into words, and words into music, continues throughout the poem," according to Janet Mcann, "becoming metaphor as well as genuine verbal music." She instances the line "Pulse pizzicati of Hosanna" as mimicking the plucking of strings as well as suggesting the sexual itch. Because music is feeling, not sound, the analogy between music and poetry is tight. Poetry is feeling too.

Other commentators bring out Stevens' use of color images: "blue-shadowed silk", "green evening", "in the green water", even the "red-eyed elders". This is a reminder that he insisted also on the analogy between poetry and painting. In The Necessary Angel Stevens speaks of identity rather than analogy: "...it is the identity of poetry revealed as between poetry in words and poetry in paint."

Eugene Nassar explores a more abstract reading (and a more contentious one), according to which the poem is about the poet's "imaginative faculty", and Susanna represents the poem and the creative process of writing it. Laurence Perrine objects that Nassar's reading does violence to the poem and the story it leans on, naively ignoring Stevens" own "violence" in yoking a character from A Midsummer Night's Dream named in the title with a biblical narrative alluded to in The Merchant of Venice. The greatest "violence" that Stevens' poem does, though, is to Susanna's biblical reputation for righteousness.

Adaptations

With all its innate musicality, it is not surprising that the poem has been adapted for music twice. Dominick  Argento set it as a "Sonatina for Mixed Chorus and Piano Concertante (1979)," and Gerald Berg set it for bass voice, clarinets, percussion and piano. Both works have been recorded.

Notes

References 
 Bates, Milton J. Wallace Stevens: a mythology of self. 1985: University of California Press.
 Kessler, Edward. Images of Wallace Stevens. 1972: Rutgers University Press.
 Nassar, Eugene. College English, volume 26.
 Perrine, Laurence. College English, volume 27.
 Stevens, Wallace. The Necessary Angel: Essays on Reality and the Imagination. (1942: Knopf)

1915 poems
American poems
Poetry by Wallace Stevens
Works originally published in Others: A Magazine of the New Verse